José Cabanis (2 March 1922 – 6 October 2000) was a French novelist, essayist, historian and magistrate. He was elected mainteneur of the Académie des Jeux floraux in 1965 and a member of the Académie française in 1990.

Works 

La Pitié (Schopenhauer, Nietzsche, Max Scheler, Dostoïevski)  (Gallimard, 1948)
L’Organisation de l’État d’après La République de Platon et La Politique d’Aristote  (Gallimard, 1948)
L’Âge ingrat  (Gallimard, 1952)
L’Auberge fameuse  (Gallimard, 1953)
Juliette Bonviolle  (Gallimard, 1954)
Le Fils  (Gallimard, 1956)
Les Mariages de raison  (Gallimard, 1957)
Jouhandeau  (Gallimard, 1959)
Le Bonheur du jour, (Gallimard, 1960), Prix des Critiques
Les Cartes du temps, (Gallimard, 1962), Prix des libraires
Plaisir et lectures. I.  (Gallimard, 1964)
Les Jeux de la nuit  (Gallimard, 1964)
Proust et l’écrivain   (Hachette, 1965)
La Bataille de Toulouse (Prix Renaudot)  (Gallimard, 1966)
Plaisir et lectures. II.  (Gallimard, 1968)
Une vie, Rimbaud  (Hachette, 1968)
Des Jardins en Espagne  (Gallimard)
Le Sacre de Napoléon  (Gallimard)
Préface du Tome I des œuvres de Julien Green  (Bibliothèque de la Pléiade, 1972)
Charles X, roi ultra (Prix des Ambassadeurs)  (Gallimard, 1974)
Saint-Simon l’admirable (Grand Prix de la Critique)  (Gallimard, 1974)
Saint-Simon ambassadeur  (Gallimard, 1974)
Les Profondes Années (Grand Prix de Littérature de l’Académie française)  (Gallimard, 1976)
Michelet, le prêtre et la femme  (Gallimard, 1978)
Petit entracte à la guerre  (Gallimard, 1980)
Lacordaire et quelques autres  (Gallimard, 1982)
Préface aux Conférences de Lacordaire à Toulouse  (Éd. d'Aujourd'hui)
Le Musée espagnol de Louis-Philippe. Goya  (Gallimard, 1986)
Préface aux Affaires de Rome, de Lamennais  (La Manufacture, 1986)
L’Escaladieu  (Gallimard, 1987)
Pages de journal   (Éd. Sables, 1987)
Pour Sainte-Beuve  (Gallimard)
Chateaubriand, qui êtes-vous ?  (La Manufacture, 1988)
Préface de La Correspondance Lacordaire-Montalembert  (Le Cerf, 1989)
L’Âge ingrat, réédition de l’ensemble du cycle  (Gallimard, 1989)
Préface du Tome II des Œuvres de Julien Green  (Bibliothèque de la Pléiade, 1990)
Le Crime de Torcy, suivi de Fausses nouvelles  (Gallimard, 1990)
En marge d’un Mauriac  (Éd. Sables, 1991)
Mauriac, le roman et Dieu  (Gallimard, 1991)
Préface à un choix de pages du Temps immobile, de Claude Mauriac   (Grasset, 1993)
Préface à Dits et inédits, de Bussy-Rabutin   (Éd. de l’Armançon, 1993)
Dieu et la NRF, 1909–1949  (Gallimard, 1994)
Le Diable à la NRF, 1911–1951  (Gallimard, 1996)
Autour de Dieu et le Diable à la NRF  (Éd. Sables, 1996)
Magnificat  (Éd. Sables, 1997)
Jardins d’écrivains (with Georges Herscher)  (Actes-Sud, 1998)
Julien Green et ses contemporains, le cas Mauriac (en collaboration à Littératures contemporaines, Julien Green)  (Klincksieck, 1998)
Le Sacre de Napoléon (new edition)  (Le Grand livre du mois, 1998)
Entretien (with Chateaubriand)  (Éd. Cristel, 1998)
Lettres de la Forêt-Noire, 1943–1998  (Gallimard, 2000)

External links 

 Académie française
 Société des Amis de José Cabanis

1922 births
2000 deaths
Writers from Toulouse
20th-century French essayists
Prix Renaudot winners
20th-century French novelists
20th-century French male writers
20th-century French historians
French male essayists
French male novelists
Prix des libraires winners